Local elections were held in the United Kingdom in 1996. They were the last local elections until 2010 to show a decline in the number of Conservative councillors and an increase in the number of Labour councillors.

The main opposition Labour Party gained 468 seats, bringing their number of councillors to 10,929.  Their share of the vote was projected to be 43%, 4% down on the 1995 local elections.

The governing Conservative Party lost 607 seats and were left with 4,276 councillors - still in third place behind the Liberal Democrats.  The Conservatives' projected share of the vote was 29%, a 4% increase since the previous local elections in 1995.

The Liberal Democrats gained 136 seats and had 5,078 councillors after the elections.

Summary of results

Source: Parliamentary Research Briefing on 1996 Local Election

England

Metropolitan boroughs
All 36 metropolitan borough councils had one third of their seats up for election.

Unitary authorities

Whole council
These were the first elections to 13 more unitary authorities established by the Local Government Commission for England (1992). They acted as "shadow authorities" until 1 April 1997.

‡ New ward boundaries from predecessor authorities

Third of council
In 1 unitary authority one third of the council was up for election.

District councils
In 100 districts one third of the council was up for election.

These were the last elections to the district councils of Blackburn, Halton, Peterborough, Reading, Slough, Southend-on-Sea, Thurrock and Wokingham before they became unitary authorities by the Local Government Commission for England (1992).

These were also the last elections to the district councils of Gillingham, Hereford, Leominster and South Herefordshire before they were abolished and replaced by unitary authorities by the Local Government Commission for England (1992).

References

The local elections of 2 May 1996. House of Commons Library Research Paper 96/59.
Vote 1999 BBC News
Vote 2000 BBC News

 
May 1996 events in the United Kingdom